The 1921 Australasian Championships was a tennis tournament that took place on outdoor Grass courts at the Kitchener Park, Perth, Australia from 26 December to 31 December. It was the 14th edition of the Australian Championships (now known as the Australian Open), the 3rd held in Perth, and the third Grand Slam tournament of the year. The single titles was won by Australian Rice Gemmell.

Finals

Singles

 Rice Gemmell defeated  Alf Hedeman  7–5, 6–1, 6–4

Doubles
 Stanley Eaton /  Rice Gemmell defeated  N. Brearley /  Edward Stokes 7–5, 6–3, 6–3

References

External links
 Australian Open official website

 
1921 in Australian tennis
1921
December 1921 sports events